Bloomsburg Historic District is a national historic district located at Bloomsburg, Columbia County, Pennsylvania, USA. The district includes 668 contributing buildings, 1 contributing site, and 1 contributing object in the central business district and surrounding residential areas of Bloomsburg. Notable non-residential buildings include the Carver Hall at the Bloomsburg University of Pennsylvania (c. 1867), Courthouse, town hall, and St. Paul's Episcopal Church.

It was added to the National Register of Historic Places in 1983.

References

Buildings and structures in Columbia County, Pennsylvania
Historic districts on the National Register of Historic Places in Pennsylvania
National Register of Historic Places in Columbia County, Pennsylvania